Pakotitanops is a genus of poorly known brontothere represented only by a few tooth fragments. Its fossil dates from the middle Eocene Kuldana Formation, in the Ganda Kas area of Pakistan. Because this species is known only from a few tooth fragments it is difficult to compare it to other species to determine if it is indeed a distinct species and to what other species it is mostly closely related.

Other brontotheres from Pakistan include Eotitanops? dayi and Mulkrajanops moghliensis. Pakotitanops is larger than either of these species. The dental fragments are most similar in size and shape to Dolichorhinus, a North American brontothere from the middle Eocene, and possibly represents a close Asian relative of Pakotitanops.

References 

 
 

Brontotheres
Eocene mammals of Asia